Michael Gregor (also known as Silenius) is an Austrian musician who is currently in the bands Amestigon (since 1998) as vocalist, Kreuzweg Ost as programmer, and Summoning as vocalist, keyboardist, and bassist; the two latter bands are bands that he is a founding member of. He supplied vocals for Abigor from 1994 to 1999 and appeared on seven of Abigor's releases. Silenius was vocalist and keyboardist for Pazuzu and played on the band's split album and debut album. Along with fellow Summoning bandmate Richard Lederer, Silenius also used to be a member of Die Verbannten Kinder Evas, serving as a vocalist and a keyboardist. Silenius has recorded music for a project called "Mirkwood", of which no material has yet been released.

Personal life 
Considering the fantasy-related lyrical content of Summoning, Michael Gregor has explained that he has been interested in the works of J. R. R. Tolkien since age 16 or 17, but was interested in fantasy literature since his childhood.

Discography

With Abigor 
In Hate & Sin (demo, 1994)
Verwüstung – Invoke The Dark Age (full-length, 1994)
Orkblut – the Retaliation (EP, 1995)
Nachthymnen (From the Twilight Kingdom) (full-length, 1995)
Opus IV (full-length, 1996)
Apokalypse (EP, 1997)
Supreme Immortal Art (full-length, 1998)
Leymotif Luzifer (full-length, 2014)
Höllenzwang (Chronicles of Perdition) (full-length, 2018)
Black Icarus / Metamorphosis (EP, 2018)
Totschläger (A Saintslayer's Songbook) (full-length, 2020)

With Amestigon 
Remembering Ancient Origins (EP, 2000)
Fatal Illumination / Nebelung, 1384 (split, 2002)
Sun of All Suns (full-length, 2009)
Thier (full-length, 2015)

With Kreuzweg Ost 
Iron Avantgarde (full-length, 2000)
Edelrost (full-length, 2005)
Gott Mit Uns (full-length, 2012)

With Pazuzu 
The Urilla Text (split, 1994)
...And All Was Silent (full-length, 1994)

With Summoning 
Upon the Viking Stallion (demo, 1993)
The Urilla Text (split, 1994)
Anno Mortiri Domini (demo, 1994)
Promo Tape (demo, 1994)
Lugburz (full-length, 1995)
Minas Morgul (demo, 1995)
Minas Morgul (full-length, 1995)
Dol Guldur (full-length, 1996)
Nightshade Forests (EP, 1997)
Stronghold (full-length, 1999)
Let Mortal Heroes Sing Your Fame (full-length, 2001)
Lost Tales (EP, 2003)
Oath Bound (full-length, 2006)
Old Mornings Dawn (full-length, 2013)
With Doom We Come (full-length, 2018)

References

External links 
 
 

Multi-instrumentalists
Living people
20th-century Austrian male singers
English-language singers from Austria
Austrian keyboardists
Black metal singers
Place of birth missing (living people)
Year of birth missing (living people)
Summoning (band)
21st-century Austrian male singers